John Young Lanning (September 6, 1910 – November 8, 1989) was an American professional baseball pitcher. He played in Major League Baseball (MLB) from 1936 to 1947 for the Boston Bees, Pittsburgh Pirates, and Boston Braves. Lanning's main pitches were a hard curve and a slow curve.

Lanning attended North Carolina State College, where he played college baseball for the Wolfpack.

During World War II, Lanning served in the US Army.

Lanning's older brother, Tom, was a pitcher for the Philadelphia Phillies.

References

External links

1910 births
1989 deaths
Albany Senators players
Asheville Tourists players
Baseball players from North Carolina
Boston Bees players
Boston Braves players
Charlotte Hornets (baseball) players
Columbia Sandlappers players
Greensboro Patriots players
Knoxville Smokies players
Major League Baseball pitchers
Marion Marauders players
Monroe Twins players
NC State Wolfpack baseball players
Pittsburgh Pirates players
Rock Hill Chiefs players
Sportspeople from Asheville, North Carolina
Springfield Cardinals players
Toronto Maple Leafs (International League) players
United States Army personnel of World War II